This is a following list of the MTV Movie Award Winners and Nominees for Best Performance from 1992 on Awards. In all but five years, the awards are separated into male and female categories.

Winners and Nominees

1990s

2000s

2010s

2020s

Multiple wins and nominations

The following individuals received two or more awards:

The following individuals received 4 or more nominations:

References

External links
 MTV

MTV Movie & TV Awards